Gaspar Iñíguez (born 26 March 1994) is an Argentine professional footballer who plays as a midfielder for Primera Nacional club Deportivo Riestra.

Club career
On 31 January 2019, he joined Ascoli on loan until the end of the 2018–19 season.

On 16 July 2019, he joined Mexican club Tiburones Rojos de Veracruz.

References

External links

1994 births
Living people
Argentine footballers
Argentina youth international footballers
Argentine expatriate footballers
Argentine Primera División players
Primera Nacional players
Serie B players
Liga MX players
Chilean Primera División players
Primera B de Chile players
Argentinos Juniors footballers
Granada CF footballers
A.C. Carpi players
Udinese Calcio players
Ascoli Calcio 1898 F.C. players
Club Atlético Tigre footballers
C.D. Veracruz footballers
Coquimbo Unido footballers
San Marcos de Arica footballers
Deportivo Riestra players
Expatriate footballers in Italy
Argentine expatriate sportspeople in Italy
Expatriate footballers in Mexico
Argentine expatriate sportspeople in Mexico
Expatriate footballers in Chile
Association football midfielders
Footballers from Buenos Aires